Aleksey Vergeyenko (born 30 Match 1975) is a Belarusian professional football coach and former player. He is a son of Mikhail Vergeyenko, a former professional football coach and player.

Coaching career
During 2012–2013 he was a head coach for Belarus national under-21 football team.

External links
 Career summary (2009)

References

1975 births
Living people
Footballers from Minsk
Belarusian footballers
Association football midfielders
FC Dinamo Minsk players
FC Dinamo-Juni Minsk players
FC Molodechno players
FC Torpedo Mogilev players
Belarusian football managers
FC Shakhtyor Soligorsk managers
FC Molodechno managers